Ceratozamia norstogii is a species of plant in the family Zamiaceae. It is endemic to the Sierra Madre de Chiapas, in Chiapas and Oaxaca states of southwestern Mexico. It is an Endangered species, threatened by habitat loss.

References

norstogii
Endemic flora of Mexico
Flora of Chiapas
Flora of Oaxaca
Sierra Madre de Chiapas
Endangered biota of Mexico
Endangered plants
Taxonomy articles created by Polbot